Kenneth Michael Karas (born April 18, 1964) is a United States district judge of the United States District Court for the Southern District of New York.

Education and career
Born in Colorado Springs, Colorado, Karas received a Bachelor of Arts degree from Georgetown University in 1986 and a Juris Doctor from Columbia Law School in 1991. Karas was a law clerk for Judge Reena Raggi of the United States District Court for the Eastern District of New York in 1992. He was an Assistant United States Attorney of the Southern District of New York from 1992 to 2004.

Federal judicial service

On September 18, 2003, Karas was nominated by President George W. Bush to a seat on the United States District Court for the Southern District of New York vacated by Allen G. Schwartz. Karas was confirmed by the United States Senate on June 3, 2004, and received his commission on June 13, 2004.

Notable cases

On January 11, 2008, Karas sentenced Olympic gold medalist Marion Jones to six months in prison for making false statements after it was discovered that she had lied to federal investigators on two separate occasions: when she and Tim Montgomery were being investigated over the BALCO scandal and about her knowledge of fellow Olympian Montgomery's involvement in fraud. On May 16 that year he sentenced Montgomery, who was also Jones' ex-boyfriend, to 46 months in prison for his part in a multimillion-dollar fake-check scheme.

In February and March 2015 Karas presided over Malcolm Smith and Dan Halloran's trials for corruption. Smith was convicted on bribery and extortion charges while Halloran was found guilty of various corruption charges, including taking bribes to aid Smith's 2013 campaign for Mayor of New York City. He turned down the defense's appeal for leniency and sentenced Halloran to ten years in prison. The high-profile trials of Smith and Halloran were part of string of cases brought forward by federal investigators in an effort to curb political corruption within the New York state government.

Personal life

He is married to Frances Bivens and has two children.

References

External links

Profile – Southern District of New York

1964 births
Living people
Assistant United States Attorneys
Columbia Law School alumni
Georgetown University alumni
Judges of the United States District Court for the Southern District of New York
People from Colorado Springs, Colorado
United States district court judges appointed by George W. Bush
21st-century American judges